The 2013 KNSB Dutch Allround Championships in speed skating were held at the Thialf ice stadium in Heerenveen, Netherlands from 29 to 30 December 2012. The tournament was part of the 2012–2013 speed skating season.

Schedule

Medalists

Allround

Distance

Men's results

 ↓ Fell
Men's results: SchaatsStatistieken.nl

Women's Results

Women's results: SchaatsStatistieken.nl

References

KNSB Dutch Allround Championships
KNSB Dutch Allround Championships
2013 Allround
KNSB Dutch Allround Championships, 2013